Hurricane Gladys was the farthest tropical cyclone from the United States to be observed by radar in the Atlantic basin since Hurricane Carla in 1961. The seventh named storm and fifth hurricane of the 1975 Atlantic hurricane season, Gladys developed from a tropical wave while several hundred miles southwest of Cape Verde on September 22. Initially, the tropical depression failed to strengthen significantly, but due to warm sea surface temperatures and low wind shear, it became Tropical Storm Gladys by September 24. Despite entering a more unfavorable environment several hundred miles east of the northern Leeward Islands, Gladys became a Category 1 hurricane on the Saffir–Simpson hurricane wind scale on September 28. Shortly thereafter, the storm reentered an area favorable for strengthening. Eventually, a well-defined eye became visible on satellite imagery.

As the storm tracked to the east of the Bahamas, a curve to the north began, at which time an anticyclone developed atop the cyclone. Thereafter, Gladys began to weaken and passed very close to Cape Race, Newfoundland before merging with a large extratropical cyclone the next day. Effects from the system along the East Coast of the United States were minimal, although heavy rainfall and rough seas were reported. In Newfoundland, strong winds and light precipitation were observed.

Meteorological history

On September 17, a tropical wave emerged into the Atlantic Ocean off the western coast of Africa. The disturbance followed another tropical wave which became Hurricane Faye several days later, before turning west near the 11th parallel. Based on estimates from the Dvorak Technique, the wave was designated a tropical depression at 18:00 UTC on September 22. Due to favorable conditions such as low wind shear and warm sea surface temperatures, the depression strengthened into a tropical storm and was named Gladys by the National Hurricane Center (NHC) on September 24. The storm then moved west-northwest, and on September 25, Gladys strengthened into a Category 1 hurricane on the Saffir–Simpson hurricane wind scale (SSHWS). Despite strong wind shear, the storm maintained minimal hurricane status.

After passing through the trough that generated the wind shear, the storm began to strengthen again. By this time, an eye was clearly visible on satellite imagery. After holding steady for 36 hours, the storm recurved around a ridge on October 1. Gladys then began to undergo rapid deepening, becoming a Category 2 hurricane at 18:00 UTC and Category 3 hurricane the following day. Early on October 2, the storm strengthened into a Category 4 hurricane. Despite its distance from Cape Hatteras, the system was briefly observed on radar. Thereafter, the storm weakened slightly, and was downgraded to a Category 3 hurricane early on October 3. The storm finally merged with a large extratropical cyclone on October 4.

Observation, preparations and impact

While over the Atlantic Ocean, a National Oceanic and Atmospheric Administration (NOAA) C-130 hurricane hunter aircraft flew into Gladys on October 1 on a research mission. The mission was to study the storm and use the information to improve seeding operations for the now-defunct Project Stormfury.

Gladys was the strongest storm to threaten the East Coast of the United States since Hurricane Hazel in 1954. Although initially not expected to threaten, meteorologists at the NHC forecast the storm to make landfall along the East Coast of the United States within three days. A hurricane watch was issued for North Carolina's Outer Banks on October 1, extending from Cape Lookout to Kitty Hawk. However, the watch discontinued as Gladys pulled away, though the storm was still considered a threat to the nation. In Manteo, residents began laying sandbags and filling their cars up with fuel in anticipation for possible evacuation, and the United States Coast Guard sent a plane equipped with a loudspeaker to warn fishermen of the hurricane. However, despite warnings, about 40 fishermen went to Cape Point near Cape Hatteras due to the "increased feeding activities" of fish during rough seas. All small crafts were advised to stay out of the water. 
Elsewhere in the Outer Banks, residents evacuated to hotels in Elizabeth City and four United States Coast Guard servicemen stationed at a lighthouse in Cape Hatteras were evacuated.

While passing the Outer Banks, a campground and road was closed due to  waves. As the cyclone moved northward. In all, the effects of the storm on North Carolina were minimal. While tracking rapidly to the southeast of Newfoundland, light rainfall was observed, including  of precipitation in St. John's. Strong winds were also reported on the island.

See also

List of Category 4 Atlantic hurricanes
Other storms of the same name

References

Gladys
Gladys (1975)
Gladys (1975)
Gladys (1975)